"Love Letter" is a single released by Gackt on March 1, 2006 under Nippon Crown. It peaked at ninth place on the Oricon weekly chart and charted for seven weeks. The A-side and B-side were used in the Mobile Suit Zeta Gundam movie , as opening and ending themes, respectively. "Dybbuk" also previously appeared on Gackt's 2003 album Crescent. It was certified gold by RIAJ.

Track listing

References

Songs about letters (message)
2006 singles
Gackt songs
Songs written by Gackt
Japanese film songs
Songs written for animated films